Mallodon is a genus of beetles belonging to the family Cerambycidae.

List of species
 Mallodon arabicum Buquet, 1843
 Mallodon baiulus Erichson, 1847
 Mallodon chevrolatii Thomson, 1867
 Mallodon dasystomus (Say, 1824)
 Mallodon downesi Hope, 1843
 Mallodon linsleyi Fragoso et Monné, 1995
 Mallodon spinibarbis (Linnaeus, 1758)
 Mallodon vermiculatus Hovore et Santos-Silva, 2004

References

 Biolib
 Miguel A. Monné, and Larry G. Bezark Checklist of the Cerambycidae, or longhorned beetles (Coleoptera) of the Western Hemisphere

Prioninae